Milo Cawthorne (born 13 January 1989) is a New Zealand actor who played Ziggy Grover from the television series Power Rangers RPM.

Career 
Cawthorne began acting as a teenager with a role on the TV show P.E.T. Detectives. After graduating from secondary school, he chose to forgo a college education and continue pursuing an acting career. He appeared in children's television shows such as Secret Agent Men, Amazing Extraordinary Friends, Maddigan's Quest, and Power Rangers RPM. In Power Rangers RPM he played the Green Ranger, Ziggy Grover, a bumbling reformed ex-cartel member.

Cawthorne had starring roles in the WWI mini-series When We Go To War and the movies Blood Punch and Deathgasm; in the latter he acted alongside another former Power Ranger, Kimberly Crossman. 

Cawthorne was nominated for Best Actor for his role in Blood Punch at the 2014 Hoboken International Film Festival in the United States, and was nominated for Best Actor: for Blood Punch at the 2017 Rialto Channel New Zealand Film Awards (The Moas).

Cawthorne has also appeared in several major New Zealand theatre productions, including "The History Boys" at the Maidment Theatre.

Personal life 
In June 2013, Cawthorne married actress Olivia Tennet, who he had been dating since they co-starred on Power Rangers RPM. However, as of June 2016, the couple had split up.

Filmography

Film

Television

Web series

References

External links
 

Living people
New Zealand male television actors
1989 births